Mandatory is a typeface developed from the Charles Wright typeface, introduced for use on vehicle registration plates of the United Kingdom. Its block letters and numbers are designed to prevent easy modification and to improve legibility, with stroke separation on the M and W which are pointed at the centre, and the tail of the Q which is thinner and clearer. It was developed in the United Kingdom, and is also used by Brazil, where it has been mandatory between 2008 and 2018, before the adoption of Mercosur plates. The Mandatory font can be downloaded free for personal use from K-Type.

In the United Kingdom, characters on vehicle registration plates purchased from 1 September 2001 must use Mandatory typeface and conform to set specifications as to width, height, stroke, spacing and margins. The physical characteristics of the number plates are set out in British Standard BS AU 145d, which specifies visibility, strength, and reflectivity.

See also 
 FE-Schrift

References 

Government typefaces
Sans-serif typefaces
Vehicle registration plates